Mr Justice Duncannon is a British television sitcom that aired on BBC TV from 18 January to 22 February 1963. It is a spin-off of Brothers in Law and stars Andrew Cruickshank as a London judge. The entire series was wiped and is no longer thought to exist.

Background
In 1962, Brothers in Law – a 13-episode sitcom inspired by the 1955 comedy novel Brothers in Law by Henry Cecil – aired on BBC TV. The last episode, "Counsel for the Prosecution", featured Cruickshank play Mr Justice Duncannon and the character was given its own series the following year. Cecil co-wrote the programme.

Plot
Duncannon is a humorous Scottish judge in London. Although stern he has a humane side. He has a fondness for women and whisky.

Cast
 Andrew Cruickshank as Mr Justice Duncannon

Episodes
Mr Justice Duncannon aired on Fridays, mostly at 8.50pm. Due to the archival policies of the time, all six episodes were subsequently wiped and no longer exist.

References

External links
 

1960s British legal television series
1960s British sitcoms
1963 British television series debuts
1963 British television series endings
BBC television sitcoms
Black-and-white British television shows
English-language television shows
Lost BBC episodes